Nathenje is a town located in the Central Region district of Lilongwe in Malawi in the continent of Africa.  Central Region's capital Lilongwe (Lilongwe) is approximately 19 km / 12 mi away from Nathenje (as the crow flies). The distance from Nathenje to Malawi's capital Lilongwe (Lilongwe) is approximately 19 km / 12 mi (as the crow flies). 

Populated places in Central Region, Malawi